Leumanang is a small uninhabited island in the Malampa Province of Vanuatu. Leumanang is a part of the Maskelyne group off south Malekula.

Geography
Leumanang is located close to Malekula Island. The two neighboring islands are Arseo and Varo.

References

Uninhabited islands of Vanuatu
Malampa Province